The Holy Monastery of Saint Gregory, also known as Gregoriou Monastery is an Orthodox Christian monastery in the monastic state of Mount Athos in Greece. The Monastery ranks seventeenth in the hierarchy of the Athonite monasteries. It is built by the sea, on the southeastern side of the peninsula, neighboring the monasteries of Simonopetras and Dionysiou. Gregoriou is very much a pilgrim friendly monastery with a strong sense of pastoral care. Pilgrim visitors are  numerous and well provided for. The Monastery is completely girt by the sea, built on a corner of land jutting into the sea, with only steep craggy rocks backed up behind it.

History
The Monastery was founded in 1310 by Saint Gregory the Hesychast (Dec. 7), a Serbian monk that dwelled in a cave, which still exists, about 20 minutes up from the Monastery. He dedicated the Monastery and the main church to Saint Nicholas the Wonderworker (Dec. 6). Saint Anastasia of Rome (Oct. 29) is officially considered the third patron saint of the Monastery, due to her holy relics that are kept there and the many miracles she performs.

Gregoriou Monastery had burnt down twice, first in 1496 and later in 1761. After the second fire, reconstruction began almost immediately. This is today's "old courtyard", consisting of the main church of St. Nicholas and most of the surrounding buildings. Due to an increase of monks since then, extensions have been added. The first entrance, following courtyard and surrounding buildings were added in 1892, and the new five story wing located east of the main church was added in 1997. Restorations are always in progress in order to maintain the monastery as functional for the life of the brothers and pilgrims.

By the end of the 15th century, according to the Russian pilgrim Isaiah, the monastery was half Greek and half Slav.

As of 2020, the brotherhood consists of over 90 monks. The Monastery is known for its involvement and contributions to theological dialogues, and for its many publications of theological and pastoral books. One way the brothers support themselves is through their handicrafts. They produce high quality traditional Athonite incense, and natural handmade olive oil soap.

The monastery holds about 300 manuscripts, of which 11 are on parchment, and it has approximately 20,000 printed books.

Notable people
Abbot Vissarion of Gregoriou (d. 1974)
Archimandrite  (1935–8 June 2014), Abbot of Grigoriou Monastery from 1974 to 2014

References

External links

Official website
Gregoriou monastery at the Mount Athos website 
Holy Monastery of Gregoriou Greek Ministry of Culture
YouTube videos of Pascha 2020 at Gregoriou Monastery

 
Christian monasteries established in the 14th century
Monasteries on Mount Athos
Greek Orthodox monasteries
Byzantine monasteries in Greece